This list is of the Places of Scenic Beauty of Japan located within the Prefecture of Okinawa.

National Places of Scenic Beauty
As of 1 June 2019, fourteen Places have been designated at a national level (including one *Special Place of Scenic Beauty).

Prefectural Places of Scenic Beauty
As of 1 May 2018, nine Places have been designated at a prefectural level.

Municipal Places of Scenic Beauty
As of 1 May 2018, a further twenty Places have been designated at a municipal level.

Registered Places of Scenic Beauty
As of 1 June 2019, three Monuments have been registered (as opposed to designated) as Places of Scenic Beauty at a national level.

See also
 Cultural Properties of Japan
 List of Historic Sites of Japan (Okinawa)
 List of parks and gardens of Okinawa Prefecture
 List of Natural Monuments of Japan (Okinawa)

References

External links
  Cultural Properties in Okinawa Prefecture
  List of Cultural Properties in Okinawa Prefecture

Tourist attractions in Okinawa Prefecture
Places of Scenic Beauty